Auguri e figli maschi! is a 1951 Italian film directed by Giorgio Simonelli.

Plot 
A marshal's daughters are engaged to three boys, but they can't get married because they can't find apartments to live in on their own. The boys finally find a place to live in peace, but a scammer tricks them into getting married quietly.  The boys later found themselves amazed at the ruin of the house. The three couples try them all: from a beauty pageant to a dating house and finally choosing the definitive accommodation in their father-in-law's house.

Cast
 Delia Scala: Silvana
 Maria Grazia Francia: Miranda
 Giovanna Pala: sister of Silvana
 Ugo Tognazzi: Mario
 Aroldo Tieri: Ruggero
 Enrico Luzi: Carmine
 Carlo Croccolo: Antoniotto
 Franca Tamantini: Paciottini's lover
 Guglielmo Inglese: Vincenzo
 Checco Durante: controllore 
 Nico Pepe: presentatore

References

External links
 

1951 films
1950s Italian-language films
Films directed by Giorgio Simonelli
Italian comedy films
1951 comedy films
Italian black-and-white films
1950s Italian films